Nowshera–Dargai Railway is one of several abandoned railway lines in Pakistan. The line begins at Nowshera Junction and ends at Dargai. There are 10 railway stations from Nowshera Junction to Dargai.

History
Opened in 1901, the line served the Malakand Division until 2002 when train service was suspended. In April 2017, Pakistan Railways proposed to rebuild the line and extend it north towards Batkhela.

Stations
 Nowshera Junction
 Risalpur Cantonment
 Rashkai
 Mardan Junction > to Charsadda
 Gujar Garhi
 Kalpani
 Takht-I-Bhai
 Hathiyan
 Sakhakot
 Dargai

See also
 Samasata-Amruka Branch Line
 Karachi–Peshawar Railway Line
 Railway lines in Pakistan

References

Railway lines opened in 1901
5 ft 6 in gauge railways in Pakistan
Railway stations on Nowshera–Dargai Railway Line